The event was held on February 23 at Deer Valley.  Pre-race favorite Bode Miller fell off the course in the second run, and many of the other top competitors struggled with an extremely challenging course.

Alain Baxter of Great Britain originally took the bronze, but was disqualified after testing positive for traces of methamphetamine.  This apparently occurred because Baxter had used a Vicks inhaler from Canada, which had a slightly different chemical content from the legal British Vicks inhaler.

Results
Complete results from the men's slalom event at the 2002 Winter Olympics.

References

External links
Official Olympic Report
Results

Slalom